Panzeri is an Italian surname. Notable people with the surname include:

Emanuele Panzeri (born 1993), Italian footballer
Mario Panzeri (1911–1991), Italian lyricist and composer
Pier Antonio Panzeri (born 1955), Italian politician

Italian-language surnames